The Thirtieth Dynasty of Egypt (notated Dynasty XXX, alternatively 30th Dynasty or Dynasty 30) is usually classified as the fifth Dynasty of the Late Period of ancient Egypt. It was founded after the overthrow of Nepherites II in 380 BC by Nectanebo I, and was disestablished upon the invasion of Egypt by the Achaemenid king Artaxerxes III in 343 BC. This is the final native dynasty of ancient Egypt; after the deposition of Nectanebo II, Egypt fell under foreign domination.

History 

Nectanebo I had gained control of all of Egypt by November of 380 BC, but spent much of his reign defending his kingdom from Persian reconquest with the occasional help of Sparta or Athens. In 365 BC, Nectanebo made his son, Teos, co-king and heir, and until his death, in 363 BC father and son reigned together. After his father's death, Teos invaded the Persian territories of modern Syria and Israel and was beginning to meet with some successes when he lost his throne due to the machinations of his own brother Tjahapimu. Tjahepimu took advantage of Teos' unpopularity within Egypt by declaring his son—and Teos' nephew, Nectanebo II—king. The Egyptian army rallied around Nectanebo II which forced Teos to flee to the court of the king of Persia.

Nectanebo II's reign was dominated by the efforts of the Persian rulers to reconquer Egypt, which they considered a satrapy in revolt. For the first ten years, Nectanebo avoided the Persian reconquest because Artaxerxes III was forced to consolidate his control of the realm. Artaxerxes then attempted an unsuccessful invasion of Egypt in the winter of 351/350 BC; the repercussions of his defeat prompted revolts in Cyprus, Phoenicia, and Cilicia.  Although Nectanebo gave support to these revolts, Artaxerxes would eventually suppress these rebellions and was once again able to invade Egypt in 343 BC. This second invasion proved successful, and Nectanebo was forced to withdraw from his defenses in the Nile Delta to Memphis, where he saw that his cause was lost. He thereupon fled south to Nubia, where he is assumed to have found refuge at the court of King Nastasen of Napata. Nectanebo, however, may have managed to maintain some form of independent rule in the south of Egypt for 2 more years since a document from Edfu is dated to his eighteenth year.

Although a shadowy figure named Khababash proclaimed himself king and led a rebellion against the Persians from about 338 to 335 BC, Nectanebo has been considered the last native pharaoh of Egypt. His flight marked the end of Egypt as an independent entity.

Pharaohs of the 30th Dynasty

Timeline of the 30th Dynasty

Family tree

References

 
States and territories established in the 4th century BC
States and territories disestablished in the 4th century BC
30
4th century BC in Egypt
380 BC
380s BC establishments
4th-century BC establishments in Egypt
4th-century BC disestablishments in Egypt
343 BC